South Korean Socialist Workers' Alliance (SKSWA; Korean: 남한사회주의노동자동맹), or shortly Sanomaeng (Korean: 사노맹), was South Korean socialist political organisation. Officially launched on 12 November 1989, the organisation was led by Baik Tae-ung and a poet Park Roh-hae. The organisation didn't last long, as Park was detained on 10 March 1991, and after the other committee members were arrested by 29 April 1992, it was officially disbanded. The organisation was also one of the largest socialist organisations after the Korean War.

Political aims 
 To abolish military dictatorship and build a democratic country
 Transform the country into a socialist state
 Build a left-wing pro-labour political party

Notable figures 
 Baik Tae-ung
Park Nohae
 Rhyu Si-min
 Eun Soo-mi
 Cho Kuk

References 

1990 in South Korea
Political movements in South Korea
Socialism in South Korea
1989 establishments in South Korea
Socialist organizations in Asia